The 2021–22 Scottish Women's Premier League was the 21st season of the SWPL, the highest division of women's football in Scotland since 2002. The league is split into two divisions – SWPL 1 with 10 teams and SWPL 2 with seven teams, following the resignation of Forfar Farmington in 2021.

Glasgow City were the defending champions of 14 consecutive seasons. City lost a decisive away derby match, 3–1, at Rangers in February 2022; a 0–0 draw in the identical fixture, on 8 May, gave Rangers the SWPL 1 title, its first Scottish women's title. The SWPL 2 champions were Dundee United, 20 points ahead of the runners-up, Glasgow Women, who won promotion with a 3–1 win in the final match against third-placed Boroughmuir Thistle.

Two clubs were promoted from SWPL 2 and none relegated from SWPL 1 due to league expansion. The league's first promotion/relegation play-off had been planned until the expansion was confirmed in April 2022 following the SWPL clubs' majority vote to leave SWF for the SPFL in February.

The league season started on 5 September 2021 and ended on 15 May 2022. The competition was known as the Scottish Building Society Scottish Women's Premier League for sponsorship reasons, then as the Park's Motor Group Scottish Women's Premier League from November 2021.

Teams

SWPL 1

Source:

SWPL 2

Source:

SWPL 1

League table

Results

Matches 1 to 18

Matches 19 to 27

SWPL 2

League table

Results

Matches 1 to 12

Matches 13 to 24

References

External links
 Official website

Scot
Scottish Women's Premier League seasons
Premier League